Iwami may refer to:

 Iwami Province (石見国), an old province of Japan
 Iwami, Shimane (石見町), a former town in Shimane, Japan
 Iwami, Tottori (岩美町), a town in Tottori, Japan
 Iwami Airport in Shimane, Japan
 Iwami Ginzan Silver Mine

People with the surname
, Japanese voice actress
, Japanese artist
, Japanese political pundit and journalist
, Japanese tennis player

See also
 Iwami Station (disambiguation)

Japanese-language surnames